The Navigation Structures at Pentwater Harbor are navigational structures located at the west end of Lowell Street in Pentwater, Michigan.  They were listed on the National Register of Historic Places in 2001.

History
In 1855, Charles Mears constructed a  channel from Pentwater Lake to Lake Michigan, lined with timber cribbing, to accommodate his lumbering interests.  In 1858, he built a pier extending over  into Lake Michigan where ships could dock. Additional pier structures were built to line the channel. The first incarnation of the channel was relatively shallow, but Mears continued to improve it, and by 1865 it was deep enough that a lake-going steamer, the Daylite, was able to sail into Pentwater Lake.

In 1868 the US government began widening and improving Mears's channel. A red 6th-order Fresnel lens was installed. A life-saving station was constructed on the north pier in 1887, and in 1917 the pierhead light was automated.

In 1937, the entire pier structure was replaced by the Army Corps of Engineers with a concrete pier. At the same time, the timber-framed lighthouse was replaced with a steel skeleton structure, and the optic replaced with a  lens.  Most of the life-saving station site, with the exception of the flag tower, was demolished in 1958. A second light was erected on the north pier in 1997.

Description
The Pentwater navigational structures consist of two concrete piers extending into Lake Michigan.

Further reading

References

Lighthouses completed in 1873
Lighthouses completed in 1937
Lighthouses completed in 1997
Oceana County, Michigan
Lighthouses on the National Register of Historic Places in Michigan
National Register of Historic Places in Oceana County, Michigan